Asunción  "Sunny"  Cummings Hostin (born October 20, 1968) is an American lawyer, journalist, and television host. Hostin is co-host on ABC's morning talk show The View as well as the Senior Legal Correspondent and Analyst for ABC News. She was also the host and executive producer of Investigation Discovery's true crime series Truth About Murder with Sunny Hostin.

Early life
Hostin was born on October 20, 1968 in New York City to a Puerto Rican mother, Rosa Beza, and an African American father, William Cummings. Her maternal grandfather is Jewish. Hostin was raised in The Bronx, New York City, attended the all-girls Dominican Academy, and is bilingual in English and Spanish. She received her Bachelor of Arts in English and Rhetoric from Binghamton University and her Juris Doctor from Notre Dame Law School.

Career
Hostin began her career as a law clerk to retired Chief Judge of the Maryland Court of Appeals Robert M. Bell and later became a trial attorney in the U.S. Department of Justice's Antitrust Division. Hostin left the Antitrust Division to become a federal prosecutor, specializing in child sex crimes. Hostin was awarded a Special Achievement Award for her successful prosecution of sex offenders. Hostin was also a Managing Director of Business Intelligence and Investigations at Kroll, the world’s leading risk-consulting company, where she led groups of investigators all over the world to investigate and uncover fraud.

She began her television career as a commentator for Court TV and was then offered a spot on the Fox News program The O'Reilly Factor, where she appeared on the show's "Is It Legal?" segments, regularly debating with Bill O'Reilly and Megyn Kelly. CNN President Jon Klein signed her to the network in September 2007 as the legal analyst for its flagship morning show American Morning. In 2014, Hostin began frequently appearing as a guest contributor on the ABC daytime talk show The View. Also in 2014, she appeared as a contestant on the Mother’s Day edition of Food Network’s Chopped. She was eliminated in the final round, but returned the next year for the Amateurs Redemption episode, which she also did not win. In 2015, Hostin participated in a TEDx Talk titled A Possibility Model that details the effects of an early trauma. In March 2016, it was announced that Hostin was joining ABC News as Senior Legal Correspondent and analyst. She became a permanent co-host of The View beginning the show's twentieth season in September 2016. In 2017, Hostin made a cameo appearance as herself in the comedy film Girls Trip.

In 2019, Hostin hosted and executive-produced the six-episode documentary series Truth About Murder With Sunny Hostin on Investigation Discovery, on which she travels to various parts of the US to explore the stories behind some of the nation’s most notorious homicides. She also hosted a podcast titled Have You Seen This Man?, produced by ABC. Hostin released I Am These Truths, a memoir, in 2020. The following year, she released a novel, titled Summer on the Bluffs. The book will be adapted into a television series. Hostin is also set to executive-produce The Counsel, a drama television series inspired by her life and career.

Personal life
Hostin is a member of Alpha Kappa Alpha sorority. She is married to orthopedic surgeon Emmanuel Hostin. They have two children, a boy and a girl. The family resides in Purchase, New York. Hostin is Catholic.

Awards and nominations

See also
 New Yorkers in journalism
 Nuyorican
 Puerto Ricans in New York City

References

External links
 
 

1968 births
Living people
20th-century African-American women
20th-century African-American people
20th-century American women lawyers
20th-century American lawyers
20th-century Puerto Rican lawyers
21st-century African-American people
21st-century African-American women
ABC News personalities
African-American lawyers
African-American television talk show hosts
African-American television personalities
African-American women lawyers
American columnists
American people of Puerto Rican descent
American people of Sephardic-Jewish descent
American social commentators
American television journalists
American television talk show hosts
American women columnists
American women television journalists
Assistant United States Attorneys
Binghamton University alumni
CNN people
Fox News people
New York (state) lawyers
Notre Dame Law School alumni
Journalists from New York City
People associated with true crime
People from the Bronx
People from Purchase, New York
Puerto Rican television talk show hosts
Puerto Rican women lawyers
University of Notre Dame alumni
African-American Catholics